Toussaint Louverture (1743–1803) was the leader of the Haitian Revolution

Toussaint Louverture or Toussaint L'Ouverture may also refer to:

Places
 Toussaint Louverture International Airport, Tabarre, Port-au-Prince, Haiti
 Toussaint L'Ouverture County Cemetery, Franklin, Williamson County, Tennessee, USA

Other uses
 Toussaint Louverture (film), a 2012 French film
 Toussaint Louverture: The Story of the Only Successful Slave Revolt in History, a three-act play by C. L. R. James

See also

 Donaldson Toussaint L'Ouverture Byrd II (1932–2013), U.S. jazz musician
 Toussaint (disambiguation)
 Ouverture (disambiguation)